Rissani is a town in Errachidia Province in eastern Morocco, located near Erfoud. It is the closest town of significant size to the Erg Chebbi, the largest sand desert in Morocco. Its population in 2004 was 20,469.

The mausoleum of Moulay Ali Cherif, third great-grandfather of Moulay Cherif, founder of the Alaouite Dynasty of Morocco, is located on the southern edge of town.

History
Rissani is the ancient capital of Tafilalet. Its location as a crossroads between north and south gave the city a certain importance in previous times.

A former major caravan center, Rissani remains a  major commercial center in  the region, with a large souk, particularly lively on Tuesdays, Thursdays and Sundays. It is noted for its leather and goat skin trading.

References 

Populated places in Errachidia Province
Burial sites of the 'Alawi dynasty